The Roman Catholic Diocese of Matehuala (erected 28 May 1997) is a suffragan diocese of the Archdiocese of San Luis Potosí.

Ordinaries
Rodrigo Aguilar Martínez (1997-2006), appointed, Bishop of Tehuacán, Puebla
Lucas Martínez Lara (2006-2016)
Margarito Salazar Cárdenas (2018-)

Episcopal See
Matehuala, San Luis Potosí

See also
 Immaculate Conception Cathedral, Matehuala

External links and references

Matehuala
Matehuala, Roman Catholic Diocese of
Matehuala
Matehuala
1960 establishments in Mexico